Denis Prokopenko (born 5 October 1991) is a Kazakh football forward, who plays for Niki Volos.

Career

Club career statistics

References

External links

1991 births
Living people
Kazakhstani footballers
FC Zhenis Astana players
Association football forwards